Mike Plume (born May 28, 1968) is a Canadian country music singer and songwriter. He was born in Moncton, New Brunswick.

Background
Canadian singer-songwriter Mike Plume fronts his roots-based namesake band. His first record, Songs From a Northern Town, was recorded in Texas and released in 1993 Touring with groups like Blue Rodeo helped build the group's following, and their 1998 album Song & Dance, Man has won them more fans and awards. In 2009 he released the album 8:30 Newfoundland, followed in June 2013 by the new album Red and White Blues.

Discography

Albums

References

Plume's career picks up steam, Edmonton Journal, September 3, 2008
The Mike Plume Band, The Vue Weekly, Aug. 27, 2008
Plum’s down home stories by way of Nashville, The Record, October 20, 2009
Biography, CMT.ca

External links
Official Website
CanadianBands.com entry
https://mikeplume.bandcamp.com

1968 births
Canadian country singer-songwriters
Canadian rock singers
Living people
Musicians from Moncton